Joakim "Jocke" Carlsson (also known as Joakim Mabergs; born 18 August 1972) is a Swedish curler.

Teams

Men's

Mixed

Private life
He is from a curling family; his brother Mathias Mabergs (né Carlsson) is a curler and coach

References

External links

Mabergs Curlingblogg - En curlingblogg med trevliga curlinghändelser i familjen Mabergs närhet
Lag – Malung Curling Club

Living people
1972 births
Swedish male curlers
European curling champions
Swedish curling champions